Gerónimo Rulli (born 20 May 1992) is an Argentine footballer who plays as a goalkeeper for Eredivisie club Ajax and the Argentina national team.

Club career

Estudiantes
Born in La Plata, Buenos Aires Province, Rulli graduated from local Estudiantes' youth setup, being promoted to the first-team squad in 2012, being initially assigned as a backup to Justo Villar and Agustín Silva. On 8 April 2013, after profiting from Villar's departure to Nacional and Silva's injury, he played his first match as a professional, starting in a 0–1 loss at Arsenal de Sarandí.

Rulli appeared in further 11 matches during the campaign, and established a record of 588 minutes without suffering a goal. He appeared in all league matches in 2013–14, overtaking Silva in the pecking order.

Real Sociedad and loan to Montpellier
On 24 July 2014 Rulli was loaned to La Liga's Real Sociedad for one year from Deportivo Maldonado, which bought the player's rights a month earlier. He made his debut for the club on 28 August, starting and being replaced in the 85th minute of a 0–3 away loss against Krasnodar in the 2014–15 UEFA Europa League due to an ankle injury.

Rulli returned to action in November, and made his debut in the main category of Spanish football on 20 December 2014, starting in a 1–1 away draw against Levante. On 4 January of the following year, he made several key saves which granted the Txuri-urdin a 1–0 home win against Barcelona.

On 4 July 2015, Rulli's loan was extended for a further year.

On 19 July 2016, Rulli was signed by Premier League side Manchester City for £4 million. He was shortly afterwards loaned back to Real Sociedad, before moving permanently in January 2017.

On 14 August 2019, Rulli joined Ligue 1 club Montpellier on a season-long loan with the option to make the transfer permanent.

Villarreal 
On 4 September 2020, after his loan ended with Montpellier, Rulli agreed to a four-year deal with Villarreal. In his first season, manager Unai Emery preferred to play Sergio Asenjo in goal in the league, and Rulli in the Europa League. He made his league debut for the club on 21 April in a 2–1 loss at Deportivo Alavés, having been chosen to prepare for the European semi-final against Arsenal.

On 26 May 2021, Rulli scored the winning penalty kick and then saved David de Gea's penalty in his side's 11–10 penalty shoot-out victory over Manchester United in the final of the 2020–21 UEFA Europa League after the game finished 1–1 at extra-time to win the first European title for Villarreal. In the second leg of the 2021–22 UEFA Champions League semi-finals, Villarreal was leading 2–0 against Liverpool in the first half to level the tie 2–2 on aggregate. In the second half, he made goalkeeping errors and conceded three goals, in which his team eventually lost 3–2 in the Estadio de la Cerámica, and was knocked out of the competition.

Ajax
On 6 January 2023, Eredivisie side Ajax announced they had agreed the transfer of Rulli with Villarreal, signing the player on a three-and-a-half-year contract.

International career

On 20 March 2015, Rulli was called up to the Argentina national team for the matches against El Salvador and Ecuador, but he did not play in either fixture. In 2016, Rulli was included in the preliminary squad for Copa América Centenario but was eventually excluded.

Rulli was chosen as the overage player for the Argentina under-23 squad at the 2016 Olympic tournament in Brazil. He played all three games in a group stage elimination, and filled in for the suspended Víctor Cuesta as captain in the last of those, a 1–1 draw with Honduras.

After Jorge Sampaoli took charge in May 2017, Rulli was consistently called up to Argentina's senior squad, but did not play. Under manager Lionel Scaloni, he made his first team debut against Guatemala on 8 September 2018, in a 3–0 friendly win in Los Angeles.

On 1 June 2022, Rulli remained as an unused substitute as Argentina won 3–0 against reigning European Champions Italy at Wembley Stadium in the 2022 Finalissima.

He was named in Argentina's final 26-man squad for the 2022 FIFA World Cup in Qatar by Scaloni. He did not play a single minute in the tournament as Argentina won the World Cup by defeating France 4–2 in a penalty shoot-out to win the final.

Career statistics

Club

International

Honours
Villarreal
UEFA Europa League: 2020–21

Argentina

 FIFA World Cup: 2022
 CONMEBOL–UEFA Cup of Champions: 2022

Individual
Ubaldo Fillol Award: 2014 Torneo Final
UEFA Europa League Squad of the Season: 2020–21

References

External links

Real Sociedad official profile
ESPN Deportes profile 

1992 births
Living people
Footballers from La Plata
Argentine footballers
Association football goalkeepers
Argentine Primera División players
Estudiantes de La Plata footballers
La Liga players
Real Sociedad footballers
Villarreal CF players
Manchester City F.C. players
AFC Ajax players
Ligue 1 players
Eredivisie players
Montpellier HSC players
Argentine expatriate footballers
Argentine expatriate sportspeople in Spain
Argentine expatriate sportspeople in France
Argentine expatriate sportspeople in the Netherlands
Expatriate footballers in Spain
Expatriate footballers in France
Expatriate footballers in the Netherlands
Footballers at the 2016 Summer Olympics
2022 FIFA World Cup players
FIFA World Cup-winning players
Olympic footballers of Argentina
Argentina international footballers
UEFA Europa League winning players